Haplogroup IJK is a human Y-chromosome DNA haplogroup. IJK is a primary branch of the macrohaplogroup HIJK. Its direct descendants are haplogroup IJ and haplogroup K.

Distribution and structure
The basal paragroup HIJK* has been found in a Mesolithic European (Magdalenian), GoyetQ-2, and the basal IJK was  found in an Upper Paleolithic European (Gravettian), Vestonice16.

Populations with high proportions of males who belong to descendant major haplogroups of Haplogroup HIJK live across widely dispersed areas and populations.
Subclades of IJK are now concentrated in males native to:
Europe (e. g. haplogroups I, J, R and N);
the Caucasus, Near East and North East Africa (e.g. haplogroups J and T);
South Asia (e.g. haplogroups J, L and R);
East Asia，Southeast Asia, Oceania, and the Pacific (e. g. haplogroups K, M, O, P, S)
Northern Eurasia, (e.g. haplogroups N and Q) and;
Native American peoples (e. g. haplogroup Q and R).

Structure

Basic phylogeny
IJK
IJK (L15/S137, L16/S138, L69.1(=G)/S163.1)
IJ (M429/P125, P123, P124, P126, P127, P129, P130, S2, S22)
K (M9, P128, P131, P132)

Phylogenetic tree

† = A basal haplogroup that has not been documented among living individuals.

(Based on the YCC 2008 tree and subsequent published research.)

Mutation

L15
The defining SNP L15 is located at Y chromosomal location rs9786139 with the ancestral value being A and the derived value being G.

L16
The defining SNP L16 is at location rs9786714 with the ancestral value being G and the derived value being A.

See also
Haplogroup
Human Y-chromosome DNA haplogroups
Y-chromosome haplogroups in populations of the world
Y-DNA haplogroups in populations of Europe
Y-DNA haplogroups in populations of South Asia
Y-DNA haplogroups in populations of East and Southeast Asia
Y-DNA haplogroups in populations of the Near East
Y-DNA haplogroups in populations of North Africa
Y-DNA haplogroups in populations of the Caucasus
Y-DNA haplogroups by ethnic group
Haplogroup IJ (Y-DNA)
Haplogroup I (Y-DNA)
Haplogroup J (Y-DNA)
Haplogroup K (Y-DNA)

References

F-L15